Zolhafah is an extinct genus of bothremydid pleurodiran turtle that was discovered in the Western Desert of Egypt. The genus consists solely of type species Z. bella.

Discovery 
Zolhafah was discovered in the Ammonite Hill Member of the Dakhla Formation, Egypt, which dates back to the Maastrichtian.

Description 
The preserved skull of Zolhafah is 7.2 centimetres in length. Its describers note that it differs from Bothremys and Rosasia by its slightly more rounded snout, with the posterior section of the skull being shortened. Similar to Bothremys, its choanae are at the same level as the triturating surface of the palate. It also differs from Bothremys and Rosasia by many small details, such as a frontal longer than its prefrontal, elongated orbits smaller than those of Rosasia and larger than those of Bothremys''', and a higher anterior premaxillary surface. The occipital condyle is slightly posterior to the quadrate's articular process, similar to Rosasia and Bothremys. The skull is the only element from the Ammonite Hills locality that can be positively assigned to Zolhafah.

 Etymology 
The etymology of Zolhafah's name is derived from the Arabic salifhafa "turtle", and the Latin bella'' "beautiful".

References 

Prehistoric turtle genera
Cretaceous turtles
Fossils of Egypt
Bothremydidae
Maastrichtian life
Fossil taxa described in 1998
Monotypic turtle genera
Western Desert (Egypt)